Close is a surname, and may refer to:

 Close (1817 cricketer), English first-class cricketer whose forename is unknown
 Alex Close, Belgian cyclist
 Brian Close, nglish cricketer
 Carl B. Close, American politician
 Charles Close, British geographer
 Chris Close, Australian rugby league player
 Chuck Close, American photorealist painter
 Del Close, American actor and theater director
 Eric Close, American actor
 Frank Close, British physicist
 Glenn Close, American actress
 Ivy Close, British beauty queen
 Joshua Close, Canadian actor
 Maxwell Henry Close, Irish geologist
 Nicholas Close, English priest
 Philippe Close, Mayor of Brussels
 Ray Close, CIA analyst
 Roberta Close, Brazilian transsexual model
 Sarah Close, English singer-songwriter
 Sasha Close, Australian actress
 Seamus Close, Northern Ireland politician
 Sigrid Close, Stanford University professor
 Thomas Close, English antiquarian and archeologist